Eriotrix is a genus of flowering plants in the daisy family, endemic to the Island of Réunion in the Indian Ocean, part of the French Republic.

 Species
 Eriotrix commersonii Cadet - Réunion
 Eriotrix lycopodioides (Lam.) DC. - Réunion

References

Asteraceae genera
Flora of Réunion
Senecioneae